Rahul Mehta is an American author. He was born and raised in West Virginia, and his work focuses on the experience of being queer and South Asian. Mehta is the winner of the Lambda Literary Award for Debut Gay Fiction and the Asian American Literary Award for Fiction for his short story collection Quarantine (2011). He teaches Creative Writing at the University of the Arts.

Bibliography 

 No Other World: A Novel, Harper, 2017
 Quarantine: Stories, HarperPerrenial, 2011

Recognition 
Mehta's work has been reviewed in many publications, including the Iowa Review, Fiction Writers Review, Lambda Literary Review, Time Out, and Booklist. Brian Leung said of Mehta's short story collection, "Quarantine marks a turning of a corner, a representative flashpoint, at least, for LGBT and Asian-American writers who have felt obligated to center their creative work around savory dishes, coming out, the exotic customs of intervening relatives, protest, all the expected signifiers." Leung concludes, "Mehta's stories acknowledge that we can occupy more than one subject position." V. Jo Hsu writes that Mehta "artfully interweaves sexual and racial tensions without creating an antagonistic "other."

Awards 

 Out Magazine Out 100, 2011
 Lamba Literary Award for Gay Debut Fiction, 2012
 Asian American Literary Award for Fiction, 2012
 American Library Association, Over The Rainbow Citation

References

External links 
 
 PBS Interview
 NDTV Interview
Minorities in Publishing Podcast Interview

Year of birth missing (living people)
Living people
American novelists of Asian descent
American short story writers of Asian descent
Lambda Literary Award for Debut Fiction winners
American LGBT novelists
Queer writers
Writers from West Virginia
LGBT people from West Virginia
American LGBT people of Asian descent